HD 34445 is a star with multiple exoplanetary companions in the equatorial constellation of Orion. With an apparent visual magnitude of 7.31, it is a 7th magnitude star that is too dim to be readily visible to the naked eye. The system is located at a distance of 150.5 light years from the Sun based on parallax measurements, but is drifting closer with a high radial velocity of −79 km/s.

This is an ordinary G-type main-sequence star with a stellar classification of G0 V, which means it is a Sun-like star that is generating energy through core hydrogen fusion. It is considered a metal-rich star, showing a much higher metallicity compared to the Sun. Despite this it is an older star and chromospherically quiet, lying about 0.8 magnitudes above the main sequence. This star is larger, hotter, brighter, and more massive than the Sun. It is spinning with a projected rotational velocity of ~3 km/s, giving it a rotation period of around 22 days.

Planetary companions
In 2004, a gas giant was found in orbit around the star, but it was not until 2009 that this planet was confirmed. In 2017, five more planets were found. The system as configured appears to be dynamically stable.

A 2021 study was only able to confirm HD 34445 b as a planet. HD 34445 e was found to likely be an artifact of the stellar rotation, HD 34445 c & d were also found to likely be false positives, and HD 34445 f was not detected.

See also 
 HD 126614
 HD 24496
 HD 13931
 Gliese 179
 QS Virginis
 List of extrasolar planets

References 

G-type main-sequence stars
Planetary systems with one confirmed planet

Orion (constellation)
BD+07 0855
034445
024681